Much More is the fifth studio album by Swedish singer Carola Häggkvist. The album contains, among others, the winning song from the Eurovision Song Contest 1991, "Fångad av en stormvind".

Track listings

Swedish release

"Every Beat of My Heart" (E Johnson / P Gessle)
"The Girl Who Had Everything" (S Diamond)
"When I Close My Eyes" (T Norell / Oson)
"State of Grace" (S Diamond / S Sheridan)
"One More Chance" (E Johnson / R Hampton / S Berg / Carola)
"The Innocence Is Gone" (P S Bliss / M Stone)
"Declaration of My Independence" (J Friedman/ A R Scott)
"I'll Live" (E Wolff / R Daniels)
"Best Shot" (S Berg / R Hampton)
"All the Reasons to Live" (S Berg / R Hampton)
"Stop Running Away from Love" (S Berg / R Hampton)
"You Are My Destiny" (?)

International release

"Captured by a Lovestorm"
"Every Beat of My Heart"
"The Girl Who Had Everything"
"When I Close My Eyes"
"State of Grace"
"I'll Live"
"Declaration of My Independence"
"The Innocence Is Gone"
"Best Shot"
"All the Reasons to Live"

Charts

Release history

References

1990 albums
Carola Häggkvist albums
Virgin Records albums